Harry Valfrid Siljander (10 December 1922 – 5 May 2010) was a Finnish light-heavyweight boxer who competed in the 1948 and 1952 Olympics.  In 1948 he lost in a quarterfinal to the eventual champion George Hunter, and placed fifth.  
Four years later he reached a semifinal, where he again lost to the eventual winner, Norvel Lee; yet he earned a bronze medal.

Siljander first trained in speed skating and swimming; he changed to boxing in 1940 while serving in the Finnish Army. In 1943 he won the Army Championships and in 1946 placed second at the national championships. In 1947 he moved from middleweight to light-heavyweight and won five Finnish titles in 1947–50 and 1952. He retired in 1952 and later worked as a butcher in Helsinki until 1986. In 2005 he was inducted into the Finnish Boxing Hall of Fame.

1952 Olympic results
Below are the results of Harry (Harri) Siljander who competed in the 1952 Olympics in Helsinki as a light heavyweight boxer:

 Round of 32: bye
 Round of 16: defeated Dumitru Ciobotaru (Romania) by a 2-1 decision.
 Quarterfinal: defeated Karl Kistner (Germany) by a 2-1 decision
 Semifinal: lost to Norvel Lee (United States) by a 0-3 decision; was awarded a bronze medal

References

1922 births
2010 deaths
Sportspeople from Helsinki
Olympic boxers of Finland
Olympic bronze medalists for Finland
Boxers at the 1948 Summer Olympics
Boxers at the 1952 Summer Olympics
Olympic medalists in boxing
Medalists at the 1952 Summer Olympics
Butchers
Finnish male boxers
Light-heavyweight boxers